Alia Salem Saeed Al Suwaidi is an Emirati civil servant and politician. In 2007 she was one of the first group of women to enter the Federal National Council.

Biography
Al Suwaidi worked in the Ministry of Health, becoming deputy director for Ajman medical district.

Following the 2006 parliamentary elections she was one of eight women appointed to the Federal National Council alongside the one elected woman, Amal Al Qubaisi.

References

Emirati civil servants
Emirati women in politics
Members of the Federal National Council
Living people
Date of birth unknown
21st-century women politicians
Year of birth missing (living people)